The women's discus throw at the 2011 European Athletics U23 Championships was held at the Městský stadion in Ostrava on 14 and 15 July.

Medalists

Schedule

Results

Qualification
Qualification: Qualification Performance 53.50 (Q) or at least 12 best performers advance to the final.

Final

Participation
According to an unofficial count, 20 athletes from 16 countries participated in the event.

References

External links
 

Discus W
Discus throw at the European Athletics U23 Championships
2011 in women's athletics